Filip Šimka (born February 18, 1986) is a Slovak professional ice hockey defenceman who is currently playing in the Polish Hockey Superleague. He had previously played in the Slovak Extraliga with MHC Martin and HK Nitra.

Career statistics

References

External links

Living people
1986 births
Slovak ice hockey defencemen
HC Prešov players
HK 95 Panthers Považská Bystrica players
HK Nitra players
HK Trnava players
MHC Martin players
MHK Dolný Kubín players
MKS Cracovia (ice hockey) players
Expatriate ice hockey players in Poland
Slovak expatriate ice hockey people
Slovak expatriate sportspeople in Poland